Pet Rock is the second and final album from English new wave/power pop band The Sinceros. The album was released worldwide and achieved moderate commercial success. The album has been released on CD by Wounded Bird. Originally intended to be released under the title 2nd Debut in 1980, the album reached the test pressing stage but was recalled by Epic Records and reworked into Pet Rock under the guidance of producer Gus Dudgeon.

Track listing
All tracks composed by Mark Kjeldsen; except where noted.
"Disappearing" 
"Memory Lane" 
"Socially" 
"Down Down" 
"Barcelona" 
"Falling In and Out of Love" 
"Sleight of Hand" 
"Nothing Changes" (Ron François)
"Girl I Realise" (Ron François)
"As the World Turns" (Ron François)
"Midsong"

Personnel
The Sinceros
Mark Kjeldsen - guitar, vocals
Ron François - bass guitar, vocals
Don Snow - keyboards, vocals
Bobby Irwin - drums
with:
Huw Gower - guitar solo on "As the World Turns"

Production credits
(Tracks 1, 2, 4, 5, 9, 11)
Produced by Gus Dudgeon
Engineered by Graham Dickson
Assisted by Mark Chamberlain
Recorded at CBS Studios, London

(Tracks 6, 8, 10)
Produced by The Sinceros
Engineered by Aldo Bocca
Assisted by Nick Froome
Recorded at Eden Studios, London
Remixed by Gus Dudgeon

(Tracks 3, 7)
Produced & engineered by Paul Riley for Riviera Global Productions Ltd.
Assisted by Rob Keyloch
Recorded at AM-Pro Studios, London
Remixed by Gus Dudgeon

Management
Management Three

Mediation
Muff Winwood, James Rubenstein, Kip Krones

1981 albums
The Sinceros albums
Albums produced by Paul Riley (musician)
Albums produced by Gus Dudgeon
Epic Records albums